Fire in the Sky is a 1993 American biopic science fiction mystery film directed by Robert Lieberman and adapted by Tracy Tormé. It is based on Travis Walton's book The Walton Experience, which describes an extraterrestrial abduction. The film stars D. B. Sweeney as Walton, and Robert Patrick as his best friend and future brother-in-law, Mike Rogers. James Garner, Craig Sheffer, Scott MacDonald, Henry Thomas and Peter Berg also star.

Fire in the Sky grossed $19.9 million domestically on a $15 million budget and received mixed reviews. It was nominated for four Saturn Awards.

Plot
On November 5, 1975 in Snowflake, Arizona, logger Travis Walton, and his co-workers — Mike Rogers, Allan Dallis, David Whitlock, Greg Hayes and Bobby Cogdill — head to work in the White Mountains.

Driving home from work, the loggers come across an unidentified flying object. Curious, Walton gets out of the truck and is struck by a bright beam of light from the object and is sent flying several feet backwards as if pushed by an unseen force. Fearing Walton has been killed, the others escape from the scene. Rogers decides to go back to the spot to retrieve Walton, but he is nowhere to be found. Making their way back to town to report the incident, the loggers are met with skepticism by investigators Sheriff Blake Davis and Lieutenant Frank Watters. Watters, realizing that there was a great deal of tension between Dallis and Walton and that Dallis has a criminal record, suspects foul play, a belief that quickly spreads to the rest of the town, leaving the loggers as social pariahs.

After a large search party turns up no sign of Travis, the loggers are offered the chance to take a lie detector test. Though Dallis is initially hesitant, the loggers ultimately take the test in the hopes of proving their innocence. However, Watters declares that the tests were inconclusive and that they will have to return the next day to retake it. Rogers is outraged and he angrily declines, the other loggers following suit. The test's administrator reveals to Watters and Davis that, with the exception of Dallis (whose test results were inconclusive), the loggers seem to be telling the truth.

Five days later, Rogers receives a call from someone claiming to be Walton. He is found at a Heber gas station, alive but naked, dehydrated and incoherent. A ufologist questions Walton but he is thrown out and Walton is taken to a hospital. Rogers visits Walton while in the emergency room and ends up telling Walton that he left him after he was struck by the light but came back to get him. Walton appears enraged by this and turns away from Rogers who blames the whole incident on Walton for getting out of the truck. During a welcome home party, Walton suffers from a mental breakdown and flashback of the abduction by the extraterrestrials.

In his flashback, he awakens inside a slimy cocoon. Breaking out of its membrane, he finds himself in a zero-gravity environment inside a cylindrical enclosure whose walls contain other similar cocoons and he is horrified to inadvertently discover that one contains the decomposing remains of a human body. As he makes his way to a neighboring area featuring what appear to be several humanoid space suits, he is apprehended by two extraterrestrial creatures. He is unwillingly hauled down corridors full of terrestrial detritus such as shoes and keys before arriving in a bizarre examination room. The aliens strip him of his clothes and cover him with an elastic material that pins him to a raised platform under an array of equipment and lights in the middle of the room. Despite Walton's terrified screams, the aliens pitilessly subject him to an experiment in which a gelatinous substance is shoved into his mouth, his jaw is clamped open, a device is inserted into his neck and he is forced to endure an ocular probe while fully conscious during the experience. Afterwards, Walton loses consciousness until finding himself back on Earth disoriented and severely traumatized.
 
While interviewing Walton, Lieutenant Watters expresses his doubts about the abduction, dismissing it as merely a hoax. He notes Walton's newfound celebrity because of the tabloids' attempts to profit from his tale, believing that he had faked the abduction to become a celebrity. However, with the investigation closed, Watters is forced to abandon his pursuit and leaves town. Two and a half years later, Walton visits Rogers, now a recluse, and the two reconcile. The closing titles inform that in 1993, Walton, Rogers, and Dallis were resubmitted to additional polygraph examinations, which they passed, corroborating their innocence.

Cast

 D. B. Sweeney as Travis Walton
 Robert Patrick as Mike Rogers
 James Garner as Lt. Frank Watters
 Craig Sheffer as Allan Dallis
 Peter Berg as David Whitlock
 Henry Thomas as Greg Hayes
 Bradley Gregg as Bobby Cogdill
 Kathleen Wilhoite as Katie Rogers
 Georgia Emelin as Dana Rogers
 Scott MacDonald as Dan Walton
 Noble Willingham as Sheriff Blake Davis
 Charles Foote as Paramedic

Production
The film is based on the book The Walton Experience by Travis Walton. In the book, Walton tells of how he was abducted by a UFO. Walton's original book was later re-released as Fire in the Sky to promote the book's connection to the film. The real Travis Walton and his wife, Dana Walton, have a brief cameo in the film.

The film's alien abduction scenes bear almost no resemblance to Walton's actual claims. Scriptwriter Tracy Tormé reported that executives found Walton's account boring, and insisted on the changes. Director Robert Lieberman suspected Travis Walton's account was a hoax, saying: "My gut feeling had it that Travis was so much smarter than those other guys, that it started out as a gag. They probably laced their beer at the end of the day with a little acid or something and then they put on a show for these guys and they believed it."

Cast members Scott MacDonald, who played Dan Walton, and Robert Patrick, who played Mike Rogers, spent time with their counterparts. Patrick, who felt typecast in villainous roles following Terminator 2: Judgment Day, gained weight and grew a beard for the audition. He later found out that he was related to his character: "Lo and behold, when I contacted the Mormons in my family, I found out through marriage, I am related to Mike Rogers. And I was like, ‘I am?!’ I called him, we spoke, I asked him specifically about how he was feeling during all this. I wanted to know his emotions. And he said to me during the abduction and the subsequent conversations afterward, that he could not control his emotion. And I tried to utilize that during the film."

The special effects in the film were coordinated by Industrial Light & Magic, and the cinematography was handled by Bill Pope. The original music score was composed and arranged by Mark Isham. The audio soundtrack was released in compact disc format on March 30, 1993 by Varèse Sarabande. An expanded limited edition CD set of the soundtrack was released by La-La Land Records on March 11, 2022, followed by a cassette release by Terror Vision Records on August 19.

Reception
Reviews for Fire in the Sky were mixed: the film holds a 48% approval rating at review aggregator website Rotten Tomatoes based on 23 appraisals, with an average score of 5.2/10. 

Nonetheless, its alien abduction scenes are considered by many to be highly effective. In 2017, Paste named Fire in the Sky as one of the 25 best science fiction films on Netflix. 

The film also had many favorable reviews. John Ferguson of the Radio Times wrote, "Lieberman wisely concentrates on the emotional impact of the event on a close-knit circle of friends and family, although the eventual revelation of the abduction is genuinely scary. D. B. Sweeney shines in the lead role and there's good support." Entertainment Weekly journalist Owen Gleiberman suggested that "It almost doesn't matter if you don't believe any of this stuff. For a few queasy minutes, Fire in the Sky lets you meditate on the aliens in your imagination." Critic Roger Ebert said, "The scenes inside the craft are really very good. They convincingly depict a reality I haven't seen in the movies before, and for once I did believe that I was seeing something truly alien, and not just a set decorator's daydreams." However, he felt that "there's not enough detail about the aliens, and the movie ends on an inconclusive and frustrating note."

Chris Hicks of the Deseret News found that Fire in the Sky "leans in favor of believers, suggesting that all of this really did happen. And some of it is fairly entertaining." However, he disliked the film's sober tone and would have preferred it be "more humorous or satirical, without necessarily sacrificing the sense that these characters believe it all." Critic James Berardinelli applauded the "stunning, gut-wrenching realism" of the abduction scenes, but called the film a "muddled-up mess" that "can't make up its mind whether it wants to be horror, drama or science-fiction." The X-Files creator Chris Carter and executive producer Frank Spotnitz were impressed by Patrick's performance in the film, which led to his casting Patrick as FBI Special Agent John Doggett for the series' eighth season in 2000.

Accolades
Fire in the Sky was nominated for four Saturn Awards: Best Science Fiction Film, Best Writing, Best Music, and for Patrick, Best Actor.

See also

 Communion, 1989 film based on Whitley Strieber's book describing experiences of alien abduction

References

External links
 
 
 Fire in the Sky at the Movie Review Query Engine
 
 

1993 films
1993 drama films
1990s mystery films
1990s science fiction drama films
Alien abduction films
Alien invasions in films
American mystery films
American science fiction drama films
American films based on actual events
Mystery films based on actual events
Films about extraterrestrial life
Films directed by Robert Lieberman
Films scored by Mark Isham
Films set in 1975
Films set in Arizona
Films shot in Oregon
Paramount Pictures films
1990s English-language films
1990s American films